Mítikah, (in Spanish a homonym of "Mítica" i.e. "Mythical"), is a mixed-use complex with Mexico City's tallest skyscraper in the Benito Juárez borough of southern Mexico City across the Circuito Interior inner ring road from Coyoacán. It opened on 23 September 2022. The tower was integrated with neighboring properties into a mixed-use residential, office, retail and medical complex, at around 1,000,000 sq. m., the largest in Latin America.

Its completion was initially planned for 2015, however, financial and permits issues stopped construction in 2014. In 2015 Fibra Uno took over the project aiming to restart construction in early 2016.

Torre Mitikah is currently the tallest building in the city (at 62 stories and ).

In 2016, the Mítikah skyscraper project was expanded into a complex to integrate with the neighboring Centro Bancomer (currently vacant) and Centro Coyoacán mall.

Shopping center
As of mid-2022, the expectation is for the mall part of the complex to contain 258 commercial spaces totalling  over five levels. Major anchors and brands present are to include: Cinépolis multicinemas; Palacio de Hierro and Liverpool department stores; H&M, Victoria Secret, Abercrombie, Hollister, Berger, Mont Blanc, Hugo Boss, All Saints. Restaurants are to include branches of Mexico City chains Puerto Madero steakhouse, Negroni, Fisher's seafood, Mochomos, Hotaru, Cheesecake Factory, Shake Shack, El Califa tacos, and Sushi Roll. 

The upscale Palacio de Hierro at the adjacent Centro Coyoacán mall will open a new store at Mítikah, and the Centro Coyoacán mall will be demolished in order to build a new phase of Mítikah.

References

External links
Official website
Page on Drone Journalism

Skyscraper office buildings in Mexico City
Shopping malls in Greater Mexico City
Mixed-use developments in Mexico
2022 establishments in Mexico
Office buildings completed in 2022
Shopping malls established in 2022